Korea Open may refer to:

Korea Open (badminton), an annual badminton tournament
Korea Open (golf), men's professional golf tournament
Korea Open (tennis), a WTA tennis tournament
Korea Open (table tennis), an ITTF table tennis tournament
Korean Open (darts), a darts tournament